Daniel Nearing (born December 21, 1961) is a Chicago, Illinois-based director, screenwriter, and independent filmmaker.
Hogtown, his "period-less" American film, has been called "the most original film made in Chicago about Chicago to date" and named one of the 10 Best Films of 2016 by Ben Kenigsberg, who reviewed the film for The New York Times. Nearing was named the inaugural Filmmaker in Residence for the City of Chicago (Chicago Film Office, Department of Cultural Affairs and Special Events) and Chicagoan of the Year for Film (2016–17) by the Chicago Tribune

His earlier breakthrough film, the micro-budget production Chicago Heights (2010) garnered rave reviews, especially among fans of the original source material, Sherwood Anderson's influential collection of short stories, Winesburg, Ohio, a book long thought impossible to be adapted as a film. Noted film critic Roger Ebert included Chicago Heights in his list of the Top Art Films of 2010.

Nearing's storytelling style tends to be more circular than linear. He views plot as a veneer that ties together the more important, character-centered aspects of any story. Nearing is known for building sequences of vignettes and using powerful imagery to focus on the isolation and humility of human life.  He works primarily in black and white, with moments of what he refers to as "ecstatic color" and with heavily shadowed, "idiosyncratic" shot compositions. Michael Phillips of the Chicago Tribune says that "Nearing's chosen way of telling a story is poetic, elliptical and sometimes unhelpfully indirect, but if he chooses, this Canadian-born, Chicago-based filmmaker could very well become a significant and lasting talent." Ben Kenigsberg of The New York Times says Nearing "is not the most accessible filmmaker, but with his new feature and his previous one, he has carved out an original and boldly unfashionable niche."

Life and career

Nearing studied for his MA in modern and contemporary literature at the University of Toronto, and went on to earn an MFA in film from Toronto's York University, and served as producer resident at the Canadian Film Centre. He has studied under Northrop Frye (Anatomy of Criticism) and Michael Ondaatje (The English Patient).

He began his film career as a documentary filmmaker, making narrative-driven documentaries for both Canadian and U.S. outlets such as the Canadian Broadcasting Corporation, Discovery Networks, The Sports Network and Bravo. His subjects have included juvenile homicide, the longest bridge in the world over ice-forming waters, Russians playing in the National Hockey League, and the stagecraft of some of the world's finest writers. He shifted his focus to dramatic projects and founded 9:23 Films in 2008, feeling that documentary filmmaking "does not allow such direct access to deeper truths."

After several attempts at a faithful adaptation of Sherwood Anderson's Winesburg, Ohio, with collaborator Rudy Thauberger, the script and its production finally clicked when Nearing decided to set the rural period piece in a contemporary city. Chicago Heights was shot for just $1,000 in 2009. Chicago Heights premiered in competition at the Busan International Film Festival and was named Best Film in a Fine Arts Discipline at the Berlin Black Film Festival.

In 2011 Nearing adapted Rudy Thauberger's Goalie, a widely anthologized Canadian short story about hockey and obsession.  The film had its world premiere at the Vancouver International Film Festival in Fall 2011.

Nearing followed those projects up with his original script Hogtown, a murder mystery set against the backdrop of the 1919 Chicago race riots. This film reveals the collective influence the works Sherwood Anderson, EL Doctorow and Michael Ondaatje have had on Nearing's work. Hogtown was filmed on location in Illinois, Indiana, Ontario and Paris.  The film stars Herman Wilkins, Diandra Lyle, McKenzie Chinn, Pete Giovagnoli, Dianne Bischoff, Alexander Sharon and Marco Garcia. The film made its US debut at Chicago's Gene Siskel Film Center. Bill Stamets of The Chicago Sun-Times has called it "the most original film made in Chicago about Chicago to date."

Nearing is presently (2021) finalizing Sister Carrie, a romantic drama set in Chicago, Montréal and Paris in 1919. The film hybridizes multiple literary sources: Theodore Dreiser's Chicago novel of the same name (1900), Alexandre Dumas' (Fils) "La Dame aux Camélias" (1848), Abbé Prévost's "Manon Lescaut" (1731), and Sherwood Anderson's "Brothers" (1921).  The film features Eve Rydberg as Carrie and internationally known ballet performer Fabrice Calmels as Armand Duval.

Filmography

Feature films
 Sister Carrie (Writer-Director-Producer, in post-production 2021)
 Hogtown (Writer-Director-Producer, 2016)
 Chicago Heights (Director, co-writer - 2010; reissued as The Last Soul on a Summer Night in 2012)

Documentaries
 Literary Olympics (Writer-Director-Producer, Bravo, 1999)
 Bomb Tech (Writer - The Discovery Channel, 1998)
 Giant's Playground (Writer-Director, The Discovery Channel, 1997)
 Soviet Reunion: The Russian Red Wings (Writer-Director-Producer, TSN - The Sports Network, 1996)
 Frayne: Portrait of the Sportswriter Laureate (Writer-Director-Producer, Canadian Broadcasting Corporation, 1995)
 The Big Train (Writer-Director-Producer, TSN - The Sports Network, 1994)
 When Children Kill (Writer-Director-Producer, Canadian Broadcasting Corporation, 1992)

Short films
 Nobody Knows (Writer-Director, 2010)
 Goalie (Director, 2011)
 Patrimony (Writer-Director, Canadian Broadcasting Corporation, 1993)

Awards and recognition
 Hogtown - One of the 10 Best Films of 2016 - Ben Kenigsberg
 Hogtown - Critics' Pick - The New York Times
 Hogtown - Best Picture - 2015 Los Angeles Black Film Festival
 Hogtown - Independent Film Playoff Winner - 2015 Los Angeles "Big House" Festival Consortium
 Hogtown - Best Feature Film - 2015 Black International Film Festival
 Hogtown - Best Film in a Fine Arts Discipline - 30th Black International Cinema Berlin
 Hogtown - Best Film Made in Chicago, 2015 - The Chicago Reader
 Chicago Heights (a.k.a. The Last Soul on a Summer Night) selected Best Art Films of 2010 by Roger Ebert
 Chicago Heights - Best Film in a Fine Arts Discipline - 25th Berlin International Cinema Berlin

Reviews
 "'Hogtown' is the most original film made in Chicago about Chicago to date. Writer-director Daniel Nearing evokes race and writers in a mesmerizing tone poem, a follow-up to his lyrically crafted 'Chicago Heights' ... an outstanding whodunit about a detective investigating the disappearance of a movie theater millionaire in 1919 Chicago. Audacious styling mixes chiaroscuro lighting and onscreen verse... Ernest Hemingway, Sherwood Anderson, Jack Dempsey ... [are] in supporting roles for an epic tragedy of race."– Bill Stamets, The Chicago Sun-Times
 "Shot for the most part in shimmering black and white, 'Hogtown' ... unfolds in loosely connected vignettes, with a mix of narrators and narrative tenses; it can feel as if you're leafing through a collection of poems ... But the film also tries to excavate a time and place, evoking the lives of the city's immigrant and marginalized residents and its 1919 race riots as well as its snowfalls, speakeasies and slaughterhouses ... 'Hogtown' plays like a find from a forgotten archive." Ben Kenigsberg, The New York Times
"Last year we created the category Best Chicago Story in hope that it would become a perennial, and that every year we could single out the locally produced short or feature that best captured the life of the city. This year we didn't even need that category, because the best Chicago story was also the best locally produced drama, period." - J.R. Jones, Chicago Reader
 "Hogtown expands into a multilayered, multicultural tapestry of a city and a century ... Though made on a minuscule budget, the film is epic in its scope and ravishingly photographed (mostly in luminous black-and-white), designed, and scored." – Marty Rubin, The Gene Siskel Film Center
 "Chicago's mysterious, sometimes painful beauty is revealed ... "Hogtown" is what it is. It captures nooks and crannies and the underside of the elevated train tracks with a true artist's eye. And there's a brief montage of gorgeously photogenic fire escapes, seen in all weather, scored beautifully by composer Paul Bhasin, that's better than the entirety of the last few features I've seen, period." - Michael Phillips, the Chicago Tribune
 "Roger Ebert ... named [the filmmakers'] previous work, Chicago Heights, one of the best art films of 2010. Hogtown is a remarkably daring piece of work conceptually ... [crafting] a narrative around the 1919 race riots ... in a way that makes the entire experience feel like a dream." – Brian Tallerico, rogerebert.com
 "A beautiful book has inspired this beautiful film." Roger Ebert, The Chicago Sun-Times
 "This stunning adaptation of Sherwood Anderson's Winesburg, Ohio ... is an aesthetic and political knockout… both profoundly affecting on its own right and as a beau ideal of detournement." Monica Westin, Flavorpill
 "poetic and haunting" – Sergio Mims, Shadow and Act: On Media of the African Diaspora
 "a gorgeously photographed, beautifully scored tour de force." – Marty Rubin, The Gene Siskel Film Center

References

External links
 9:23 Films
 Hogtown at the Gene Siskel Film Center
 Staying Personal in Hogtown
 Black Harvest Film Festival Sees History with Style
 rogerebert.com Black Harvest Film Festival Preview

1961 births
Living people
American filmmakers
Writers from Chicago